Isaac Smith may refer to:

Isaac Smith (footballer) (born 1988), Australian rules footballer 
Isaac Smith (New Jersey politician) (1740–1807), United States Representative from New Jersey 
Isaac Smith (Pennsylvania politician) (1761–1834), United States Representative from Pennsylvania 
Isaac Smith (priest) (active 1600s), Anglican priest in Ireland 
Isaac Smith (Royal Navy officer) (1752–1831), Royal Navy officer and the first European to set foot in eastern Australia 
Isaac Smith Jr. (1749–1829), American minister and librarian
Isaac C. Smith (1797–1877), New York sail and steamboat captain, shipbuilder, sparmaker and entrepreneur 
Isaac D. Smith (born 1932), US Army general
Isaac E. Smith (1858–1940), boat builder who built the first Star Class sailboats
Isaac W. Smith (surveyor) (1826–1897), American soldier and surveyor
USS Isaac Smith, a merchant steamboat built in 1861 that served as a Union Navy gunboat, and later a Confederate blockade runner, during the American Civil War 

Smith, Isaac